The Wartime perception of the Chinese Communists in the United States and other Western nations before and during World War II varied widely in both the public and government circles. The Soviet Union, whose support had been crucial to the Party from its founding, also supported the Nationalist government in order to defeat Japan and protect Russian territory.

Founded in 1921, the Communist Party was initially allied with the Kuomintang until the second half of the 1920s, when it was purged from membership within the unified national government under Chiang Kai-shek.  In 1934, the party nearly annihilated, the remnants under the guidance of future Chairman Mao Zedong launched an ambitious retreat to escape destruction by the Kuomintang, known as The Long March. The  Second Sino-Japanese War began in August 1937, and the Communists soon joined the United Front with the Nationalists, but by the time the United States was brought into the war by the Japanese attack on  Pearl Harbor in 1941, the United Front had broken down. 

During the war, there was much debate over the role of the Communist armies in fighting Japan, the nature of the Communist regime, and especially its intentions for cooperation or opposition after the war.

Perceptions in the West
Much of the Western world was introduced to Communism in China on the eve war in 1937 through  Red Star Over China, a narrative of the Long March and introductory biography for several Communist leaders, by the American journalist, Edgar Snow. Snow reported that Mao was not a radical revolutionary, downplaying his calls for class struggle and highlighting his anti-imperialist rhetoric, He later described Mao and the Communist as a progressive force who desired a democratic, free China. Writing for The Nation, Snow stated that the Chinese Communists "happen to have renounced, years ago now, any intention of establishing communism [in China] in the near future." 

In 1944, when the invasion of Japan was still expected to launch from China, Washington sent the Dixie Mission to the Communist base in Yan'an. John Service, a Foreign Service Officer, visited in order to communicate and coordinate use of Communist armies against the Japanese. He praised the strength of their armies, urged communication with them to support the proposed invasion, and claimed that they were democratic reformers, likening them to European socialists rather than Soviet Communists and claimed that they were less corrupt and chaotic than the Nationalists, and that they would preserve levels of capitalism for an extended time until a peaceful transition to a fully realized communist society.

The US discussed with Chiang's government whether to send aid to the Chinese Communists during the war. Frustrated with Nationalist disorganization and corruption, Ambassador to China Clarence Gauss recommended the United States "pull up the plug and let the whole Chinese Government go down the drain". General Patrick Hurley accepted Stalin's assurance that the Chinese Communists were "radish Communists," red on the outside, white on the inside, and insisted that the differences between the Communists and Nationalists were no greater than those between the Republican and Democratic parties in the United States. China Burma India Theater Commander Joseph Stilwell repeatedly claimed (in contradiction to Comintern statistics) that Communists were doing more than the KMT against Japan, and sought to cut off all US aid to Chiang. 

Soviet foreign minister Vyacheslav Molotov told General Hurley that Mao and the rest of the Chinese Communists were not really Communists and that the Kremlin had no connections with them. The claims were accepted by Hurley at face value.

Perceptions in the Soviet Union

Stalin privately underestimated the Chinese Communists and their ability to win a civil war, instead encouraging them to make peace with the KMT. Stalin was worried that Mao would become an independent rival force in world communism, preferring a divided China with Mao subordinate to the KMT.

Perceptions in China
During the war, the CCP avoided any radical class-related policies of wealth or land redistribution so as to maximise national unity against the Japanese. This was highly successful at raising the CCP's popularity which reached its highest ever level. In addition, the peasants only joined the communists en masse after the Japanese invaded, rather than cooperate with the invaders. Hence it is demonstrable that Communist popularity did not come from their land reform proposals or rural poverty.

The Japanese puppet government of China produced extensive propaganda claiming that their main purpose was anti-communism, which backfired and helped to bolster the legitimacy of Communists further among the peasant victims of Japanese reprisals.

When the KMT right wing objected to CCP expansion of influence as part of guerilla campaigns, they were attacked on patriotic grounds. The Communists were able to gain popular legitimacy for their actions as long as they were carrying out resistance against Japan with greater aggressiveness than the KMT government, and this advantage was utilized by the Communists as seen in the New Fourth Army Incident.

Perceptions in Japan
The Japanese described the communist guerillas of New Fourth Army as inferior in weapons to the KMT, but superior in training and discipline. One report noted that local residents in Fuan and Anfeng welcomed the orderly Communist troops due to good treatment of the locals.

The Japanese military treated the Chinese Communists with contempt, dismissed their own intelligence officers' reports of communist strength and insisted that the Communists were nothing more than bandits, which led to the Hundred Regiments Offensive coming as an absolute shock for the Imperial Japanese Army.

See also
 Chinese Communist Party
 People's Republic of China
 History of the People's Republic of China
 Chinese Civil War
 Dixie Mission
 China Hands

References 

China in World War II
Politics of World War II